Morris East (born August 8, 1973, in Olongapo, Philippines) is a retired Filipino professional boxer and boxing trainer. East is the former GAB Light Middleweight, OPBF and WBA World Light Welterweight champion. Morris has trained world champions Zab Judah and Nonito Donaire.

Amateur career
As a teenager, East moved to Cebu City and was spotted by Lito Cortes who brought him to the Cebu Coliseum gym. Promoter Sammy Gello-ani then offered him amateur fights to keep him earning for his meals.

Professional career

WBA Light Welterweight Championship
East turned professional in 1989 and won the WBA World Light Welterweight Championship by defeating Akinobu Hiranaka with an 11th-round TKO victory in Tokyo on 9 September 1992. With the victory, East became the youngest ever Filipino to hold a world championship in boxing at the age of 19 years and 31 days old. He is also the second youngest boxer to win a world title at 140 lbs., second to Puerto Rico's Wilfred Benítez, who won the WBA World Jr. Welterweight title when he was 17 years old. The victory over Hiranaka was named Ring Magazine Knockout of the Year for 1992. Morris lost the title in his first defense against Juan Martin Coggi.

East would retire after winning and defending the Philippines Games & Amusement Board Light Middleweight Championship in 1995 at only 21 years of age.

Professional boxing record

Training career
East moved to San Diego, California in 1996 and later moved to Las Vegas, where he works as a fight trainer in the Johnny Tocco gym. In 2011, he worked with IBF light welterweight titleholder Zab Judah and WBC/WBO bantamweight champion Nonito Donaire. East also worked with Eddie Mustafa Muhammad.

Personal life
Born of a Filipina and black American U.S. Navy sailor, East didn't meet his father until he became champion. He traveled from the Philippines to the United States a month after winning his WBA belt to locate his father, John East, Sr. With the help of a long-lost sister and the CNN news team, the father was located in Oakland, California and their first meeting was broadcast by CNN. Morris improved his father's living condition but his father, suffering from bad health, died of cancer a few months later.

References

External links
 

1973 births
Living people
World boxing champions
World Boxing Association champions
Southpaw boxers
Welterweight boxers
Filipino male boxers
Sportspeople from Olongapo